1833 in archaeology

Explorations

Excavations

Publications
 Juan Galindo publishes first mention of Maya site of Yaxchilan

Finds
 Mold cape discovered in Wales
 Ice age decorated harpoon and engraving found in Haute-Savoie
 Ram Khamhaeng Inscription discovered by Prince Mongkut of Thailand

Awards

Miscellaneous

Births
March 17 - Charles Edwin Wilbour, American Egyptologist and writer (d. 1896)
July 14 - Alfred Biliotti, Italian Levantine British consular officer and archaeologist (d. 1915)
July 26 - Alexander Henry Rhind, Scottish Egyptologist (d. 1863)

Deaths

See also
 List of years in archaeology
 1832 in archaeology
 1834 in archaeology

References

Archaeology
Archaeology by year
Archaeology
Archaeology